Luis Castro (1905 – death date unknown) was a Cuban catcher in the Negro leagues.

A native of Havana, Cuba, Castro played for the Cuban Stars (East) in 1929 and 1930. In ten recorded games, he posted two hits and four walks in 23 plate appearances.

References

External links
 and Baseball-Reference Black Baseball stats and Seamheads

Date of birth missing
Year of death missing
Place of death missing
Cuban Stars (East) players
Baseball catchers
Baseball players from Havana
1905 births